The Mining Industry Act 1926 was an Act of the Parliament of the United Kingdom.  It made  "provision for facilitating the working of minerals and the better organisation of the coal mining industry, and with respect to the welfare of persons employed therein, and for other purposes connected with that industry."

United Kingdom Acts of Parliament 1926
Repealed United Kingdom Acts of Parliament
Mining in the United Kingdom